

Gmina Głuchołazy is an urban-rural gmina (administrative district) in Nysa County, Opole Voivodeship, in south-western Poland, on the Czech border.

The gmina contains part of the protected area called Opawskie Mountains Landscape Park.

Villages
Gmina Głuchołazy includes the following villages and settlements:

Biskupów
Bodzanów
Burgrabice
Charbielin
Gierałcice
Głuchołazy
Jarnołtówek
Konradów
Markowice
Nowy Las
Nowy Świętów
Podlesie
Pokrzywna
Polski Świętów
Rudawa
Sławniowice
Stary Las
Sucha Kamienica
Wilamowice Nyskie

Neighbouring gminas
Gmina Głuchołazy is bordered by the gminas of Nysa, Otmuchów and Prudnik. It also borders the Czech Republic.

Twin towns – sister cities

Gmina Głuchołazy is twinned with:
 Jeseník, Czech Republic
 Mikulovice, Czech Republic
 Zlaté Hory, Czech Republic

References

Glucholazy
Nysa County